The Women's Overall in the 2018 FIS Alpine Skiing World Cup involved 38 events in 5 disciplines: downhill (DH), Super-G (SG), giant slalom (GS), slalom (SL) [which included parallel slaloms and city events], and Alpine combined (AC).

Defending champion Mikaela Shiffrin of the United States won 12 events during the season, including 9 in the slalom discipline (seven actual slaloms plus two parallel events), just short of the all-time record of 14, to easily win the overall title.  Runner-up Wendy Holdener of Switzerland was over 600 points behind, and they were the only two women to earn over 1,000 points for the season.

The season was interrupted by the 2018 Winter Olympics from 12-24 February 2018 at Yongpyong Alpine Centre (slalom and giant slalom) at the Alpensia Sports Park in PyeongChang and at the Jeongseon Alpine Centre (speed events) in Jeongseon, South Korea.

The season finals were held in Åre, Sweden.

Standings

See also
 2018 Alpine Skiing World Cup – Women's summary rankings
 2018 Alpine Skiing World Cup – Women's Downhill
 2018 Alpine Skiing World Cup – Women's Super-G
 2018 Alpine Skiing World Cup – Women's Giant Slalom
 2018 Alpine Skiing World Cup – Women's Slalom
 2018 Alpine Skiing World Cup – Women's Combined
 2018 Alpine Skiing World Cup – Men's Overall

References

External links
 Alpine Skiing at FIS website

Women's Overall
FIS Alpine Ski World Cup overall titles